Lewis Cole "Buster" Simpson (born in 1942) is an American sculptor and environmental artist based in Seattle, Washington.

Career

Lewis Cole Simpson was born in Saginaw, Michigan and raised in a nearby farming community. He became interested in art while attending junior college in Flint and attended the University of Michigan in Ann Arbor, graduating in 1969 with a master in fine arts. After graduating, Simpson joined other artists at the Woodstock Festival in New York state, helping build play areas for festivalgoers.

Simpson caught the attention of glass artist Dale Chihuly in 1971 while giving a talk at the Rhode Island School of Design and invited him to join the new Pilchuck Glass School near Stanwood, Washington. Two years later, Simpson moved to Seattle and began his work in "recycled art" at a studio in Pioneer Square. During the 1970s, Simpson created several pieces of public art along Post Alley near Pike Place Market, utilizing materials from dumpsters and thrift shops for Shared Clothesline and discarded bottles as scrap glass for 90 Pine Show and Counterparts. He also developed an alter ego, named "Woodman", used during street performances while scavenging for materials.

During the 1980s, Simpson engaged in "agitprop" work, including dropping soft limestone blocks in the headwaters of the Hudson River that was dubbed by the media as "River Rolaids".
Simpson was later commissioned by institutions and governments across the United States and Canada to create public art to display in cities. Simpson was given his first career retrospective in 2013 at the Frye Art Museum in Seattle, called Buster Simpson: Surveyor.

In 2019, Buster Simpson was included in two group exhibitions exploring the material glass as vehicle for sculpture, in painting and as tool of conceptual inspiration - An Alternative History: The Other Glass, in New York City and As In Also: An Alternative Too, in Seattle - each organized by artist, published author and independent curator John Drury.

Works

2009 Public Art Network Award from Americans for the Arts

References

External links

Buster Simpson: Surveyor

1942 births
Living people
20th-century American sculptors
20th-century American male artists
Pacific Northwest artists
People from Saginaw, Michigan
University of Michigan alumni